Luca Dallavalle (born 14 July 1987 in Cles) is an Italian mountain bike orienteer. He won a bronze medal in the middle distance at the 2010 World MTB Orienteering Championships in Montalegre. 5 years later, at the 2015 World MTB Orienteering Championships in Liberec, he won 3 medals: one gold, one silver and one bronze, respectively on the sprint, middle and long distance races.
In June 2016 he's on the top of males world ranking of MTB-O.  

Dallavalle practises also extreme skiing. He skied many classical lines in Dolomites, Adamello-Presanella, Ortles-Cevedale in Alps and he found new extreme descent lines from the same mountains.

References

External links

1987 births
People from Cles
Italian orienteers
Male orienteers
Italian male cyclists
Mountain bike orienteers
Living people
Sportspeople from Trentino
Cyclists from Trentino-Alto Adige/Südtirol